The Boston University Tanglewood Institute (BUTI) is a summer music training program for students age 10 to 20 in Lenox, Massachusetts, under the auspices of the Boston University College of Fine Arts.

History 
BUTI was envisioned in 1965 when Erich Leinsdorf, then music director of the Boston Symphony Orchestra (BSO), invited Edward Stein, dean of the Boston University College of Fine Arts, to create a summer training program for young musicians as an extension to the BSO’s Tanglewood Music Center (TMC). BUTI opened for its inaugural season the following June.

Groton Place, the central building on campus, was home to multiple organizations prior to BUTI’s residency. Built in 1905 as a summer home for Grenville Lindall Winthrop, it was purchased in 1943 to serve as the home for the Windsor Mountain School. After that the site was used to host the now-defunct Holliston College from 1976 to 1980, after which Boston University purchased the property to operate BUTI.

BUTI celebrated its 50th anniversary season in 2016.

Campus 
BUTI’s 64-acre campus is situated at 45 West Street in Lenox, Massachusetts, approximately one mile from the Tanglewood Music Festival. This property contains instructional and practice facilities, a 250-seat proscenium theater, dormitories, administrative offices, and a cafeteria. BUTI also utilizes instructional facilities at Tanglewood, Berkshire Country Day School, and Morris Elementary School, and performance venues including Seiji Ozawa Hall, the Koussevitzky Music Shed, Trinity Episcopal Church, and Church on the Hill.

Academics
During June, July, and August, BUTI offers 23 individual programs for strings, woodwinds, brass, percussion, harp, voice, piano, and composition. In mid-June, a series of two-week workshops are offered for flute, oboe, clarinet, bassoon, saxophone, French horn, trumpet, trombone, tuba and euphonium, percussion, violin, viola, cello, double bass, string quartet, and electroacoustic composition. Students attending these programs range in age from 14 to 20. A Junior Strings Intensive, introduced for the first time in summer 2017, is also offered during these two weeks and is for violin, viola, and cello students age 10–13.

Beginning in July a series of longer programs begin, including a three- or six-week Young Artists Piano Program, four-week Young Artists Wind Ensemble, and six-week Young Artists Vocal Program, Young Artists Composition Program, and Young Artists Orchestra. These programs are for students age 14–19 who have not yet begun full-time college study.

BUTI also offers elective courses, including music theory and music history, and a health and wellness series consisting of Feldenkrais Method, yoga, and body mapping.

Concert Season 
The BUTI concert season consists of more than 70 events per summer, including six performances at Seiji Ozawa Hall and one at Tanglewood on Parade. Performances include large-ensemble concerts, student and faculty recitals, chamber music, art song recitals, opera scenes, and new music recitals. Most performances are free and open to the public.

Alumni
Notable alumni include:
 Lauren Ambrose, actor
 Kenneth Amis, composer, tuba player, educator, and conductor
 Steven Ansell, principal violist, Boston Symphony Orchestra
 Mason Bates, composer
 David Bernard, Music Director, Park Avenue Chamber Symphony
 Michael Brown, pianist-composer
 Harry Connick, Jr., musician, actor
 Joseph Conyers, assistant principal double bassist, Philadelphia Orchestra
 David Krauss, principal trumpet, Metropolitan Opera
 Benjamin Levy, double bassist, Boston Symphony Orchestra
 Missy Mazzoli, composer
 Nico Muhly, composer
 Charles Pikler, principal violist, Chicago Symphony Orchestra
 Todd Seeber, double bassist, Boston Symphony Orchestra
 Neal Stulberg, pianist-conductor
 Lawrence Wolfe, double bassist, Boston Symphony Orchestra 
 Owen Young, cellist, Boston Symphony Orchestra
 Michael Gordon, principal flutist, Kansas City Symphony

References

External links 
 Official Boston University Tanglewood Institute Website

Boston University
Boston University Tanglewood Institute